The name Jose has been used for six tropical cyclones worldwide, five in the Atlantic Ocean and one in the Western Pacific Ocean, a typhoon that traversed the Philippine Atmospheric, Geophysical and Astronomical Services Administration (PAGASA) area of responsibility. The name was retired by PAGASA from future use in the region after that one use, and replaced with Josie for the 2018 Pacific typhoon season.

In the Atlantic:
 Tropical Storm Jose (1981) – short-lived and weak storm that did not impact land.
 Hurricane Jose (1999) – Category 2 hurricane that caused moderate damage in the Lesser Antilles.
 Tropical Storm Jose (2005) – formed very close to Mexico, made landfall hours later as a weak tropical storm.
 Tropical Storm Jose (2011) – formed south-southwest of Bermuda, dissipating two days later.
 Hurricane Jose (2017) – long-lived hurricane that brushed the Lesser Antilles as a strong Category 4 hurricane and later brought heavy rain and rough surf to the East Coast of the United States as a tropical storm.

In the Western Pacific:
 Typhoon Halong (2014) (T1411, 11W, Jose) – a Category 5 super typhoon that enhanced monsoonal rains in the Philippines but remained off-shore and later made landfall on Shikoku, Japan, as a minimal typhoon.

Atlantic hurricane set index articles
Pacific typhoon set index articles